Monistrol-sur-Loire is a commune in the Haute-Loire department in south-central France.

Geography
The river Lignon du Velay flows into the Loire in the commune.

Population

Peronsalities
Roman Catholic archbishop Armand-François-Marie de Charbonnel

See also

Communes of the Haute-Loire department

References

Communes of Haute-Loire
Velay